This is a list of 176 genera in Phasmatidae, a family of walkingsticks in the order Phasmatodea.

Phasmatidae genera

 Acanthograeffea  c g
 Acanthomenexenus  c g
 Acanthomima  c g
 Acanthoxyla  c g
 Achrioptera  c g
 Acrophylla  c g
 Agamemnon  c g
 Anchiale  c g
 Anophelepis  c g
 Aploploides  c g
 Aplopocranidium  c g
 Apterograeffea  c g
 Apteroplopus  c g
 Argosarchus  c g
 Arphax  c g
 Asprenas  c g
 Austrocarausius  c g
 Baculofractum  c g
 Baculonistria  c g
 Brachyrtacus  c g
 Breviphetes  c g
 Caledoniophasma  c g
 Canachus  c g
 Carausius Stål, 1875 c g b
 Carlius  c g
 Cephaloplopus  c g
 Chondrostethus  c g
 Cigarrophasma  c g
 Cladomimus  c g
 Cladomorphus  c g
 Cladoxerus  c g
 Clitarchus  c g
 Cnipsomorpha  c g
 Cnipsus  c g
 Cotylosoma  c g
 Cranidium  c g
 Ctenomorpha  c g
 Cuniculina  c g
 Davidrentzia  c g
 Denhama  c g
 Diagoras  c g
 Diapherodes  c g
 Didymuria  c g
 Dimorphodes  c g
 Dryococelus  c g
 Echetlus  c g
 Echinothorax  c g
 Ectentoria  c g
 Elicius  c g
 Entoria  c g
 Epicharmus  c g
 Erastus  c g
 Erinaceophasma  c g
 Erringtonia  c g
 Eucarcharus  c g
 Eupromachus  c g
 Eurycantha  c g
 Eurycnema  c g
 Extatosoma  c g
 Gigantophasma  c g
 Glawiana  c g
 Gongylopus  c g
 Graeffea  c g
 Greenia  c g
 Guamuhaya  c g
 Haplopus Burmeister, 1838 i c g b
 Hermagoras  c g
 Hermarchus  c g
 Hesperophasma  c g
 Heterophasma  c g
 Hirtuleius  c g
 Hypocyrtus  c g
 Hyrtacus  c g
 Interphasma  c g
 Jeremia  c g
 Jeremiodes  c g
 Labidiophasma  c g
 Lamponius  c g
 Leosthenes  c g
 Leprocaulinus  c g
 Lobofemora  c g
 Lonchodes  c g
 Lonchodiodes  c g
 Lysicles  c g
 Macrophasma  c g
 Malandania  c g
 Manduria  c g
 Matutumetes  c g
 Mauritiophasma  c g
 Medaura  c g
 Medauroidea  c g
 Medauromorpha  c g
 Megacrania  c g
 Megalophasma  c g
 Menexenus  c g
 Mesentoria  c g
 Metentoria  c g
 Microcanachus  c g
 Micropodacanthus  c g
 Mithrenes  c g
 Mnesilochus  c g
 Monandroptera  c g
 Monoiognosis  c g
 Mortites  c g
 Myronides  c g
 Neopromachus  c g
 Nesiophasma  c g
 Nisyrus  c g
 Onchestus  c g
 Ophicrania  c g
 Oreophasma  c g
 Otocrania  c g
 Otocraniella  c g
 Papuacocelus  c g
 Parabactridium  c g
 Parabaculum  c g
 Paracanachus  c g
 Paracranidium  c g
 Paractenomorpha  c g
 Paracyphocrania  c g
 Paraentoria  c g
 Paraleiophasma  c g
 Parapachymorpha  c g
 Parapodacanthus  c g
 Paraprisomera  c g
 Paratropidoderus  c g
 Parhaplopus  c g
 Paronchestus  c g
 Peloriana  c g
 Pericentropsis  c g
 Pericentrus  c g
 Periphetes  c g
 Pharnacia  c g
 Phasma  c g
 Phasmotaenia  c g
 Phenacephorus  c g
 Phenacocephalus  c g
 Phobaeticus  c g
 Phraortes  c g
 Phryganistria  c g
 Platycrana  c g
 Podacanthus  c g
 Prisomera  c g
 Prosentoria  c g
 Pseudoclitarchus  c g
 Pseudososibia Ho, 2017 g
 Pseudostheneboea  c g
 Pterinoxylus  c g
 Ramulus  c g
 Redtenbacherus  c g
 Rhamphophasma  c g
 Rhaphiderus  c g
 Rhynchacris  c g
 Sadyattes  c g
 Spathomorpha  c g
 Spinophetes  c g
 Staelonchodes  c g
 Stephanacris  c g
 Stheneboea  c g
 Symetriophasma  c g
 Tainophasma  c g
 Taraxippus  c g
 Tepakiphasma  c g
 Teruelphasma  c g
 Thaumatobactron  c g
 Tirachoidea  c g
 Trapezaspis  c g
 Tropidoderus  c g
 Vasilissa  c g
 Venupherodes  c g
 Wattenwylia  c g
 Woodmasonia  c g
 Xenomaches  c g
 Xenophasmina  c g
 Xeroderus  c g
 Xylodus  c g

Data sources: i = ITIS, c = Catalogue of Life, g = GBIF, b = Bugguide.net

References

Phasmatodea genera